Vamsha Jyothi is a 1978 Indian Kannada-language film, directed by A. Bhimsingh and produced by K. S. Prasad. The film stars Kalpana, Vishnuvardhan, Rajesh and Bhavani. The film has musical score by G. K. Venkatesh.

Cast

Kalpana
Vishnuvardhan
Lokesh
Rajesh
Chandrashekhar
Hema Choudhary
K. S. Ashwath
T. N. Balakrishna
Dwarakish
Shylashri
B. Jaya
Bhavani (actress)

Soundtrack
The music was composed by G. K. Venkatesh.

References

External links

1978 films
1970s Kannada-language films
Films directed by A. Bhimsingh
Films scored by G. K. Venkatesh